Avalpoondurai is a panchayat town in Erode district in the state of Tamil Nadu, India. It is situated 14 kilometres from Erode and an important junction on SH-83A en route to Dharapuram and other important small towns like Modakuruchi and Elumathur.
It is about 415 km from Chennai, 100 km from Palani, 100 km from Coimbatore, 50 km from Tiruppur and from Gobicheittipalayam.

Demographics 
 India census, Avalpoondurai had a population of 11,230.  Males constitute 52% of the population and females 48%.  Avalpoondurai has an average literacy rate of 63%, higher than the national average of 59.5%; with 60% of the males and 40% of females literate. 8% of the population is under 6 years of age.

Religion

Pushpavaneswarar Temple
Pushpavaneswarar Temple is one of the shrines of the Vaippu Sthalams sung by Tamil Saivite Nayanar Appar. The presiding deity is known as Pushpavanesvarar. His consort is known as Bagampiriyal. The shrine of the Goddess is found as a separate temple. In the prakara separate shrines are found for Navagraha, Bairava, Surya and others. Vinayaka is found under Vanni Tree. In the kosta Dakshinamurthy, Lingodbhava and Brahma are found. This place is sung as "Menmaiperu Poondurai" (The Great Poondurai), "Pon mevum Poondurai" (The Gold found Poondurai), and "Ponnulakor pugalnthidum Poondurai" (Poondurai beloved by one and all). Kaliyanna Pulavar sung Poondurai Puranam about this temple.

Digambar Jain temple Avalpoondurai 

A more or less 1000 year old ancient Jain temple in Avalpoondurai village.

Transportation 

There are frequent buses available to Avalpoondurai from Erode, Elumathur, Arachalur, Vellokovil, Kangeyam, Dharapuram, Palani, Salem and a few other places.

The nearest airport is Coimbatore Airport and Salem Airport.

The nearest railway stations are Erode railway station and Perundurai railway station.

Boat house 
A government boat house and park was constructed in Avalpoondurai.

Education  
 Government Higher Secondary School Avalpoondurai.
Lions matriculation higher secondary school Avalpoondurai.
Navarasam matriculation higher secondary school Palliyuthu.
Isha Vidhya Matriculation Hr. Sec. School perumapalayam.
Bharathiar University Arts and Science College Elumathur.
Navarasam arts and science college Arachalur.

References 

Cities and towns in Erode district